The Punisher is a Marvel comic book series featuring the character Frank Castle, also known as the Punisher, written by Greg Rucka. This series of The Punisher continues the tradition of Matt Fraction's War Journal series and Rick Remender's previous Punisher series and places the character firmly in the ongoings of the larger Marvel Universe, interacting with other superheroes like Spider-Man, the Avengers, and Wolverine more frequently than before.

Although the series' first issue was released at the time of the Fear Itself event, Rucka stated his intent to focus the series solely on the Punisher's exploits without having larger Marvel U events interfere with the flow of the series, but if need be, could interact with other heroes when the story called for it.

Story
The series, although being a self-titled Punisher ongoing, does not have many internal monologues, nor does Castle speak often throughout the series. It's instead focused on the impact that the Punisher's actions have on those around him, and the repercussions those actions create for other characters involved in the story. In the first arc, Castle is committed to taking down a criminal organization known as "The Exchange," and is later joined by a former Marine whose husband was murdered on the couple's wedding day.

The grief-stricken wife, Rachel Cole, seeks the Punisher out and the two create a bond due to their mutual time in the United States Marine Corps. Cole (who insists on being addressed by her married name of Alves) serves under Castle's command, and the two treat each target they seek to kill as a two-man military operation with Castle maintaining a command structure.

Midway through the series, Cole and the Punisher become involved in one of Daredevil's exploits, who is holding a device called the "Omega Drive" containing damning information on all the major crime organizations in the Marvel Universe. The Punisher wants the device for obvious reasons, as it would give him a multitude of new targets to neutralize. Spider-Man also becomes involved, and the story is told in one issue of Avenging Spider-Man, one issue of Daredevil, and one issue of The Punisher.

Follow-up
The series concluded with issue #16, at which point Rucka and Checcetto moved on to a 5-issue mini-series entitled Punisher: War Zone to finish their story. The War Zone series involves the Punisher's operations in the final issues of the ongoing series attracting the attention of the Avengers. This was Rucka's final story with the Punisher as of 2017.

Collected editions
 Punisher by Greg Rucka Vol. 1 (collects The Punisher vol. 9, #1-5), February 2012
 Punisher by Greg Rucka Vol. 2 (collects The Punisher vol. 9, #6-10, Avenging Spider-Man #6, and Daredevil vol. 3 #11), September 2012
 Punisher by Greg Rucka Vol. 3 (collects The Punisher vol. 9, #11-16), March 2013

See also
 2011 in comics

References

Sources

External links
The Punisher (2011 series) at the Comic Book DB

Punisher titles
Comics by Greg Rucka
Comics set in New York City
Defunct American comics